Jani Beg, also known as Djanibek Khan, was a Khan of the Golden Horde from 1342 to 1357, succeeding his father Öz Beg Khan.

Reign
With the support of his mother Taydula Khatun, Jani Beg made himself khan after eliminating his older brother and rival Tini Beg at Saray-Jük in 1342; he had already killed another ambitious brother, Khiḍr Beg. He is known to have actively interfered in the affairs of Rus principalities and of Lithuania. The Grand Princes of Moscow, Simeon Gordiy and Ivan II were under constant political and military pressure from Jani Beg.

Jani Beg commanded a massive Crimean Tatar force that attacked the Crimean port city of Kaffa in 1343. The siege was lifted by an Italian relief force in February. In 1345 Jani Beg again besieged Kaffa; however, his assault was again unsuccessful due to an outbreak of the Black Plague among his troops. Jani Beg's army catapulted infected corpses into Kaffa in an attempt to use the Black Death to weaken the defenders. Infected Genoese sailors subsequently sailed from Kaffa to Genoa, Messina, and Constantinople, introducing the Black Death into Europe. The story involving the catapult has been disputed. It is originally based on Gabriel de Mussis of Piacenza in Italy who wrote about the plague in 1348. It is more likely that rats carrying plague infested fleas went from camp to city and thereby infected the Genoese.

In 1356 Jani Beg conducted a military campaign in Azerbaijan and conquered the city of Tabriz, installing his own governor. He also asserted Jochid dominance over the Chagatai Khanate, attempting to unite the three khanates of the Mongol Empire. After accepting surrender from Shaikh Uvais, Jani Beg boasted that three uluses (districts/nations) of the Mongol Empire were under his control. Soon after this, he faced an uprising in Tabriz resulting in the rise to power of the Jalayirid dynasty, an offshoot of Ilkhanate, and ultimately in the death of the Khan.

Muscovy's Chudov Monastery, founded at about the time of Jani Beg's fall by Metropolitan Aleksii and Sergei of Radonezh, was built on land that according to legend was granted to Aleksii by the Khan as thanks for the miraculous curing of his mother Taydula by the former.

The reign of Jani Beg was marked by the first signs of the feudal strife which would eventually contribute to the demise of the Golden Horde. Jani Beg's assassination in 1357 opened a quarter-century of political turmoil within the Golden Horde. Twenty-five khans succeeded each other between 1357 and 1378.

Catalan Atlas (1375)

Jani Beg appears in the 1375 Catalan Atlas: the Mongol polity of the Golden Horde is accurately depicted north of the Caspian sea. Jani Beg has been identified in this representation, being mentioned as "Jambech senyor de Sarra", and the flag of the Golden Horde also appears. The caption to the right of his depiction reads:

The symbolism of the Golden Horde flag depicted by the Catalan Atlas is fairly similar to the type of tamgha symbols (such as ) actually found on the coinage of the Golden Horde. Such symbols were used until the time of Jani Beg, but essentially disappear thereafter.

Family

Jani Beg had a number of sons, only one of whom, Berdi Beg, reigned after him but who proceeded to eliminate his brothers. Two or three more khans appear to have claimed to be Jani Beg's sons and are sometimes treated as such by modern scholars.

Berdi Beg (r. 1357–1359)
(pretended?) Qulpa (r. 1359–1360)
(pretended?) Nawruz Beg (r. 1360)
(pretended?) Kildi Beg (r. 1361–1362)
 a daughter, Shakar Beg, married Aq Sufi Qongirat, the prince of the Sufi dynasty of Khwarezm. Their daughter Khanzada Begum later married into the Timurid dynasty.

Genealogy

Genghis Khan
Jochi
Batu Khan
Toqoqan
Mengu-Timur
Toghrilcha
Uzbeg Khan
Jani Beg

Popular culture
The 2012 Russian film The Horde is set during the reign of Jani Beg and is a highly fictionalised narrative of how Aleksii healed Taidula from blindness.

See also
List of Khans of the Golden Horde

References

Bibliography 
Buell, P. D., Historical Dictionary of the Mongol World Empire Oxford, 2003.
 Gaev, A. G., "Genealogija i hronologija Džučidov," Numizmatičeskij sbornik 3 (2002) 9-55.
 Horrox, R., The Black Death

 David Morgan, The Mongols
 Počekaev, R. J., Cari ordynskie: Biografii hanov i pravitelej Zolotoj Ordy. Saint Petersburg, 2010.

1357 deaths
Khans of the Golden Horde
Murdered royalty
14th-century monarchs in Europe
Year of birth unknown
Mongol Empire Muslims